Nina Basu is a lawyer and the president of the Inner Arbor Trust, the organization that manages Merriweather Park at Symphony Woods.  She is a resident of Columbia, Maryland, and native of Howard County.

Biography

Basu studied history and government at Dartmouth College and earned her Juris Doctor degree in 2008 from the University of Maryland School of Law.   After graduating from law school, Basu worked for McGuireWoods for four years before leaving to start her own practice.

Public service

Basu has served on the Long Reach Village Board since first elected in 2003.  Her focus has been on renewing the village and eliminating crime. Since 2017, Basu has led the villages efforts to rebuild the Long Reach village center.  The village center had been in decline for years and following the village center's purchase by the Howard County government, Basu has worked with the county and developers to improve the health and safety of the area.

Basu became president of the Inner Arbor Trust at the start of its inaugural year with the Chrysalis, a new multipurpose stage and outdoor amphitheater.  During that year, she organized ballet, big band, and classical concerts, and a park-wide haunted woods feature.  Basu also led new collaborative efforts with the neighboring Merriweather Post Pavilion.

In 2017, Basu led legal teams at the Baltimore–Washington International Airport and the Washington Dulles International Airport.  Her teams provided legal advice and protection to individuals entering the United States.

Awards

 Maryland's Leading Women, 2015
 The Daily Record VIP List, 2019
 The Daily Record Most Admired CEOs Honoree, 2022

References 

 

1980 births
American arts administrators
American lawyers
Bengali Hindus
People from Columbia, Maryland
Dartmouth College alumni
Living people
University of Maryland Francis King Carey School of Law alumni
21st-century American women lawyers
21st-century American lawyers